Estadio Municipal Carlos Vidaurre García is a multi-use stadium in Tarapoto, Peru.  It is used mostly for football matches, on club level by Unión Comercio of the Peruvian Primera División. The stadium has a capacity of 18,000 spectators.

References

External links 

Carlos Vidaurre Garcia
Buildings and structures in San Martín Region
Tarapoto